Eddie Perfect (born 17 December 1977) is an Australian singer-songwriter, pianist, comedian, writer and actor.

Widely known for his role as Mick Holland in Channel Ten's TV series Offspring in which he performs his own music, he has recorded solo albums and written and performed numerous cabaret shows, including Songs from the Middle with the Brodsky Quartet.  His biographical musical comedy Shane Warne: The Musical won the 2009 Helpmann Award for Best New Australian Work, a Victorian Premier's Literary Award and a Green Room Award. Following his songwriting career on Broadway, where he composed Beetlejuice and King Kong, Perfect returned to Australia where he was to star as Franklin Hart Jr. in Dolly Parton's musical 9 to 5 in late 2020, although it was subsequently indefinitely postponed due to the COVID-19 pandemic.

Personal life
He was educated at St Bede's College, in Mentone, Victoria where he was the dux of the school in 1995. He undertook a Bachelor of Arts at the Western Australian Academy of Performing Arts, graduating in 2001.

Eddie is married to Lucy Cochran (sister of composer and pianist Julian Cochran) and has two daughters, Kitty and Charlotte.

Career
Known for his political comedy, he has appeared on Australian TV shows including Kath & Kim, Spicks and Specks, Good News Week, Stingers, Blue Heelers, MDA, The Melbourne Comedy Festival Gala and The Sideshow. Perfect released the solo albums Welcome to the Inside of Ed's Head and Angry Eddie, which was released after his appearance on the anti-Howard Government compilation Rock Against Howard. He was awarded the best entertainer in The Bulletin's Brightest 100 Australians for his caustic lyrics, impeccable timing and 'boy-next-door' looks.

Perfect has appeared in live stage shows including The Big Con with veteran Australian actor and impersonator Max Gillies in 2005, and his solo show Drink Pepsi, Bitch!, which satirised Australian politics and society and consumer culture. Drink Pepsi, Bitch! toured the Edinburgh Fringe, London's Menier Chocolate Factory, the Auckland Festival, the Christchurch Festival, Melbourne's Malthouse Theatre, the Adelaide Fringe Festival, and Sydney 'Cracker' Comedy Festival, although he was obliged to censor the show's title (which was amended to Drink Eddie™ Bitch!) for his season at the Sydney Opera House due to the beverage company named in the title being a principal sponsor of the venue.

In 2007, Perfect appeared in Keating! the Musical playing several characters, including a parody of former Australian Minister for Foreign Affairs Alexander Downer.

In 2008, Perfect wrote Shane Warne: The Musical, a satire based on the life and exploits of Australian test cricketer Shane Warne. The musical had a workshop showing at the Adelaide Cabaret Festival on 17 July 2007 and the piece underwent further workshopping in early 2008 culminating in five work-in-progress showings at The Hi-Fi Bar and Ballroom as part of the Melbourne International Comedy Festival. Shane Warne The Musical premiered at the Melbourne Athenaeum Theatre on 10 December 2008 before embarking on a national tour. In 2009 the musical received the Helpmann Award for Best New Australian Work, the Green Room Award and a Victorian Premier's Literary Award. Updated to reflect new developments in Warne's life, the show enjoyed a revival at Hamer Hall in Melbourne in June 2013, directed by Simon Phillips, with Perfect in the title role and co-starring Lisa McCune, Shane Jacobson  and Christie Whelan-Browne as Liz Hurley.  A cast recording was released in 2014.

In November 2009, he hosted the Inside Film Awards at Sydney's Luna Park.

In 2010, he performed Songs from the Middle, a song cycle inspired by Perfect's childhood in Mentone, Victoria. Eamonn Kelley in The Australian described the work as "a poignant narrative of adult reconciliation with a place and a past from which he fled at the first opportunity, restless and with no sense of belonging". He played the lead role of Mack the Knife in The Threepenny Opera at the Malthouse Theatre, Melbourne.  In 2011 he played the same role in the Sydney Theatre Company's remount of this production. He hosted FOX8's Ultimate School Musical, which he also directed. Later in the year he played the role of Mick Holland in Channel Ten's Offspring comedy-drama series. He also presented an award at the 2010 ARIA Music Awards.

His solo show Misanthropology premiered at the Spiegeltent, in January 2011, as part of the Sydney Festival. Mingling satire and homage, with Perfect's arrangements for a three-piece band, Perfect wanted to provide "a kind of social autopsy [of our] cultural rituals." In targeting eco-tourists, self-righteous cyclists, and others including Barrie Kosky, Perfect tried to examine "the qualities that have driven our evolution, such as the urge to conquer and compete, and the urge to procreate, trip us up and reveal us as the animals we really are." Perfect said of the show: "Tonight I invite you to laugh and think and question humanity in all of its wondrous idiocy. Remember, healthy, cynical self-reflection is what separates us from Kyle Sandilands."

On 28 October 2015, it was confirmed that Perfect would be a new judge on Australia's Got Talent for its eighth season.

In December 2019, Perfect wrote a song for Tourism Australia's new advertising campaign targeting British audiences. It debuted prior to the Queen's annual Christmas message.

In 2020, Perfect participated in The Masked Singer Australia as the "Frillneck" and placed third on the second season of the show.

Broadway
In 2015, Perfect moved to New York to pursue a career on Broadway, where he met with John Buzzetti, the American agent for fellow Australian songwriter and comedian Tim Minchin, a close friend of Perfect. Since moving to New York, Perfect has written songs for two Broadway musicals during the 2018–19 season; King Kong (which opened at the Broadway Theatre in October 2018, and closed in August 2019) and Beetlejuice (which opened at the Winter Garden Theatre in April 2019, following a pre-Broadway tryout at the National Theatre in Washington D.C. in October 2018).

Return to the stage
Following Perfect's success in New York, he planned to return to the stage to star in the Australian Premier of Dolly Parton's musical, 9 to 5 in the leading role of Franklin Hart Jr. The show was due to begin previews at Sydney's Lyric Theatre on 19 April 2020, before touring to Melbourne's Her Majesty's Theatre from 25 July. However, due to the global coronavirus pandemic, the production was delayed until finally opening in Sydney's Capitol Theatre on 16 February 2022. The show will also play Brisbane (from May 2022) and Melbourne (July 2022).

Filmography

Discography

Albums
 Welcome to the Inside of Ed's Head (2003) Middle Eight Music
 Angry Eddie (2005) Madman Entertainment
 Drink Pepsi, Bitch (2006) Middle Eight Music/Smart Artists
 "The Colors Tribute Album Vol. 1 with The Renovators" Vitamin Records
 "Misanthropology" (2011)
 "Beetlejuice: The Demos The Demos The Demos" (2020) Ghostlight Records

Featured on
 Hayden Tea (2003)
 Chelsea Plumley, Live and Luscious (2004)
 Rock Against Howard (2004)
 Spicks & Specks (2005–09) 5 episodes
 The Sideshow (2007) 2 episodes 
 The Book Club (2009) 1 episode
 Good News Week (2009–11) 3 episodes 
 Inside Film Awards (2009–11) 2 episodes 
 Ultimate School Musical (2010) 10 episodes
 Talkin' 'Bout Your Generation (2010; 2018) 2 episodes
 Q&A (2010) 1 episode
 Aria Awards (2010) Presenter 
 The Project (2010–12) 5 episodes
 Jameson IF Awards Sydney (2011) TV Special 
 Australian Songs (2013)
 Dirty Laundry Live (2013–14) 3 episodes
 Australian Story (2014) Presenter 
 Play School (2015–)
 ABC's 2016 New Year's Eve Celebrations (2015–16)
 Australia's Got Talent (2016)

Awards and nominations

APRA Awards
The APRA Awards are presented annually from 1982 by the Australasian Performing Right Association (APRA), "honouring composers and songwriters". They commenced in 1982.

! 
|-
| 2013 
| "You Make Me Happy" (Clare Bowditch and Eddie Perfect)
| Song of the Year
| 
| 
|-

Helpmann Awards
The Helpmann Awards is for live performance in Australia and are awarded annually by Live Performance Australia.

Tony Awards
The Tony Award is for live performance on Broadway and are awarded annually by American Theatre Wing and The Broadway League.

References

External links
 
Shane Warne: the Musical – official website

1977 births
21st-century Australian comedians
21st-century Australian male actors
21st-century Australian musicians
21st-century Australian singers
Australian children's television presenters
Australian male comedians
Australian male television actors
Australian musical theatre composers
Australian musical theatre lyricists
Australian pianists
Australian satirists
Edith Cowan University alumni
Helpmann Award winners
Living people
Male actors from Melbourne
Male musical theatre composers
Western Australian Academy of Performing Arts alumni